Ismail Shahid (born August 17, 1955 in Utmanzai village of Charsadda, KPK, Pakistan) is a Pakistani actor and comedian.

In July 2016, he released two tele-films for Eid, Buda Kaka and Roond, Kunr ao Chaara. In December 2017, Shahid was one of 75 performers and sportspeople to be awarded at the Pride of Peshawar.

See also
Syed Rahman Shino
Mirawas
 Jamal Afridi
 Murad Ali
 Khurshid Jehan
 Imtiaz Khan
 Asfandiyar
 Uzair Sherpao
 Umar Gul

References

https://www.youtube.com/watch?v=bWJa5rSb3fE [Za Yam Janjali] Ismail Shahid best Drama

External links 
 Facebook Page
 Official Youtube Channel

1955 births
Living people
Pakistani male comedians
Pashtun people
University of Peshawar alumni
People from Charsadda District, Pakistan
https://www.youtube.com/watch?v=bWJa5rSb3fE [Za Yam Janjali] Ismail Shahid best Drama